Caesar ( (supposedly) – 1852) was an enslaved person who is notable for possibly being the earliest-born person ever photographed while alive, when his daguerreotype was taken in 1851. He was also the last slave to be manumitted in New York.

Biography
Caesar was supposedly born in 1737, on the property of Rensselaer Nicoll, who owned the Bethlehem House property in Bethlehem, New York. Within his lifetime, Caesar had outlived at least three or four generations of masters on the Nicoll estate in Bethlehem. He was allowed to retire in 1817, at the age of 80, and lived with the Nicoll family until his death.

Although most slaves in New York were freed by July 4, 1827, he was not officially manumitted until around 1841, when all forms of slavery were banned in New York.

In 1849, the artist G. W. Woodward had a sketch of Caesar drawn as he sat dozing in a chair, which has since been lost. In 1851, his final master's son persuaded Caesar to sit for a daguerreotype portrait, one of the earliest photographic images of an African American. The 1/6th plate daguerreotype later became known as Daguerreotype of Caesar: A slave. A note included with the portrait reads: "Ceasar , born a slave of Van R. Nicoll, son of William, in 1737 at Bethlehem, N.Y., where he died in 1852. The last slave to die in the North. This daguerreotype was taken in 1851. His 2nd master was Francis Nicoll, son of Van R. Nicoll and his 3rd master Wm. Nicoll Sill, grandson of Francis who left all to his wife Margaret Sill . . ."

Caesar died in 1852, aged 115, according to the inscription on his marble tombstone, in the state of New York. Currently no contemporary evidence has been found which can verify his age. Only his year of death is certain. If his age is confirmed, he would not only be one of the earliest-born persons ever photographed (surpassing Conrad Heyer and other such claimants), he would be one of the longest-lived Americans on record.

References 

1737 births
1852 deaths
18th-century American slaves
19th-century American slaves
Bethlehem, New York
History of photography
Longevity claims